Logania marmorata, the pale mottle, is a butterfly in the family Lycaenidae. It was described by Frederic Moore in 1884. It is found in the Indomalayan realm.

Subspecies
 Logania marmorata marmorata (southern Burma, Thailand, Laos, Vietnam)
 Logania marmorata damis Fruhstorfer, 1914 (Thailand, Langkawi, Malay Peninsula, Singapore)
 Logania marmorata hilaeira Fruhstorfer, 1914 (Sumatra, Borneo)
 Logania marmorata lahomius (Kheil, 1884) (Nias)
 Logania marmorata diehli Eliot, 1986 (Simalur)
 Logania marmorata munichya Fruhstorfer, 1914 (western Java)
 Logania marmorata javanica Fruhstorfer, 1914 (eastern Java, Sumbawa, Flores)
 Logania marmorata palawana Fruhstorfer, 1914 (Palawan, Balabac, Luzon, Marinduque)
 Logania marmorata samosata Fruhstorfer, 1914 (Cebu, Mindoro)
 Logania marmorata faustina Fruhstorfer, 1914 (Mindanao, Leyte, Samar, Sulu, Tawi Tawi)

References

External links
Logania at Markku Savela's Lepidoptera and Some Other Life Forms

Logania (butterfly)
Butterflies described in 1884